Doctor Strange: The Oath is a 2007 comic book limited series written by Brian K. Vaughan, drawn by Marcos Martin, published by Marvel Comics and starring the superhero Doctor Strange.  The story follows Doctor Strange as he searches for the person who tried to kill him, while he also looks for a stolen magical elixir that will cure the terminal cancer of Wong, his faithful servant.  Doctor Strange finds himself facing another disciple of the Ancient One, who has learned about the elixir and is determined to destroy it.

Plot summary
During a rainy night in New York City, inside the hospice belonging to Night Nurse, Wong, servant to the Sorcerer Supreme, drags in the unconscious, bleeding Doctor Strange, begging for help.  He had been running errands and returned to the Sanctum Sanctorum to find that Strange had been shot during a burglary. Strange appears in his astral form and tells Night Nurse that if she didn't hurry, he'd be dead before Wong could finish.

Inside the office of Dr. Nicodemus West, a thief named Brigand hands him a bottle containing the Otkid's Elixir and an amulet. He claims that he killed Doctor Strange during the theft and shows him a gun that fires silver bullets.  West tells him should have made sure Strange was dead.

Night Nurse operates on Strange as Wong explains how the Sorcerer learned of his illness. Inside the Sanctorum, Strange accidentally found Wong's bottle of pills containing a targeting agent for brain tumors. The servant had hoped to keep his terminal cancer a secret until his replacement could be found.  Strange refuses to accept his fate and remembers reading about a panacea called the Otkid's Elixir.

Following the directions to a specific location, he opened a portal to another dimension to find the elixir.  When the man begs him not to go, Strange reminds him of the Hippocratic Oath he had taken before entering the portal.  After finding it, he sent a sample for testing to his friend, Dr. Jonas Hilt.  He was examining the rest inside the Sanctorum when he was attacked by Brigand.

Strange takes Wong and Night Nurse to Hilt's research lab.  Inside, they find the place destroyed and the sample gone.  Hilt is dead, shot by the same gun that had been used on Strange. The Eye of Agamotto leads them to Brigand's hideout where Strange forces him to reveal that the sorcerer helping him was the same West who had been unable to repair his hands.

At Timely Pharmaceuticals, West's employer, he meets with the board members.  He scoffs when they claim they only want humanity to get cures at a natural pace. He asks if they really mean that if a cure was found, they would lose their powerful lucrative jobs.  The CEO counters by saying that he wouldn't have killed Dr. Hilt if he thought they were wrong.  They order him to end their problem with Strange.

Strange suggests they return to the hospice.  They arrive to find a Marrrakant Hellguard blocking the entrance, which the Sorcerer destroys, before opening a portal to its summoning origin.  When they walk through to West's room, he imprisons them in a holding spell, and Strange demands to know who taught him magic.

West was determined to find a way restore his hands. After locating the Ancient One, he started to learn the mystic arts, but quickly grew bored and left.  When he tried using some magic on a bedridden, terminal cancer patient, the botched spell backfired, causing all the cells in his body to explode.

He was about to turn himself over to the police when he was stopped by two CEOs from Timely. They followed him because they didn't want the increasing use of magic to affect their industry, so they offered him a lucrative deal. He would track and keep users of magic in check, and in return they would cover his mistake.

After Strange breaks the holding spell, Wong collapses.  West teleports to a bathroom, but before he can dump the elixir down the drain, Strange appears. West admits that he thinks the liquid is poison and people need cures by natural means.  Strange counters by asking if things like CT scans were natural.  He feels that West is scared that not all magic is harmful and the cancer patient had been killed by his incompetence as a sorcerer.

West teleports to the roof with Strange in pursuit, and they engage in a fistfight.  Strange reveals his training in the martial arts and delivers several severe blows.  West falls over the edge of the roof, taking the elixir with him.  The vial shatters, leaving only a tiny drop on top a broken piece.  West's astral projection appears and tells Strange to make a choice: save Wong or take the necessary amount of time to recreate it.  As his projection fades, he asks Strange to think about which choice he could live with.

A day later, Wong wakes up with no trace of cancer. Strange assures him that his life was worth the final bit.  Night Nurse shows the Sorcerer a confession memo she had lifted from West's office.  He had created it for the Timely board members to remind them of the extreme measures they had used to destroy the Otkid's elixir and silence everyone who knew about it.  Strange is so grateful that he invites her to set up a new hospice inside his Sanctorum.

References

Comics by Brian K. Vaughan
Doctor Strange titles